The Farm is the only album by American country music band The Farm. It was released on July 17, 2012 via Elektra Records. The album includes the top 20 single "Home Sweet Home."

Track listing

Chart performance

Album

References

2012 debut albums
The Farm (U.S. band) albums
Elektra Records albums